Leonard Long Park, or simply Long Park, is a public park in Molalla, Oregon, United States.

External links
 
 Leonard Long Park at the City of Molalla, Oregon

Molalla, Oregon
Municipal parks in Oregon